The Office of Radio and Television of Mali (Office de radiodiffusion et de télévision du Mali, ORTM) is the national broadcaster of the West African state of Mali.

History
Malian broadcasting began in 1957 as a one kilowatt radio station called Radio Soudan in Bamako, then administrative center of the French colony of French Soudan. After independence in 1960, Radio Nationale du Mali (Radio-Mali) began broadcasting from la maison de la Radio in the Bozola neighbourhood of Bamako.  Technical abilities were bolstered with Czech transmitters ranging from 18 to 30 kilowatts in 1962.

In 1970, the Chinese government constructed four 50 kW radio transmitters about 7 km from Bamako, towards Kati, enabling Radio Mali to reach much of West Africa. On 22 September 1983, a Libyan financed television broadcast centre was opened in Bamako, enabling RTM to broadcast one channel of colour television. French and German grant programmes between 1984 and 1990 enabled news and reporting to expand, with regional stations opening in Ségou (1986), Koulikoro (1989), Sikasso (1990) and Mopti (1993). In 1992, a second national broadcast radio network (Chiffre II) was added.

On 5 October 1992, the Malian government split off the RTM  according to "Law 92-021", from direct government control, becoming a publicly financed, independently run entity (an "Établissement Public à Caractère Administratif (EPA)"). This was part of the national liberalisation process, moving the nation to the "Third Malian Republic". Private broadcasters were legalised, and RTM was reorganised as the ORTM on 1 January 1993.

ORTM was seized by National Committee for the Restoration of Democracy and State (CNRDR) forces on 21 March 2012 as part of the 2012 Malian coup d'état. A thousand-person protest was held on 26 March, chanting "Down with Sanogo" and "Liberate the ORTM".

Current output
In 2002, ORTM had 35 local radio and/or television broadcast points or repeaters, with TV/radio broadcast points in all eight Regions of Mali.  From its headquarters in Bamako, ORTM produces two radio networks (RTM and Chiffre II), a national television network (RTM), and directs the work of a number of regional RTM radio stations.

Considered one of the freest news markets in Africa, although government office holders threaten (and sometimes resort to) prosecution of broadcasters under Mali's strict anti-libel laws.  In 2001, the head of OTRM was threatened with jail after the government attempted to prosecute RTM for an interview in which the mayor of Bamako accused the Malian judiciary of corruption.  Since 1992, broadcasting is no longer a state monopoly.  There are two large private multi-channel television providers, and numerous private radio stations.  Mali is also considered a world leader in community radio development, with ORTM helping to set up the Union des Radios et Televisions Libres (URTEL) , a network of over a hundred independently locally operated stations.  OTRM also partners with other government and international organisations in education and development programs throughout Mali.

Programming
RTM Radio and television broadcast news and information programming, light entertainment (both foreign and domestic), music and sport.  Most national broadcasts are in French, with several hours of Bambara language programming, as well as regional broadcasting in other languages. Emission Hebdomadaire d'Information, the weekly ORTM news magazine, has been broadcasting each Sunday at noon since 1998, and is anchored by Manga Dembélé and Youssouf Touré.  A daily news program is broadcast twice daily.  Chiffre II radio network is simulcast on the OTRM website, while television broadcasts are carried on regional satellite.  ORTM television regularly broadcasts local sport, mostly  Malien Première Division football matches, to an eager audience at least three days a week.

References

General
 www.ortm.ml/ Office de radiodiffusion et de télévision du Mali.
 Pascal James Imperato,  Historical Dictionary Of Mali. Scarecrow Press, 1986.  
 The French language Wikipedia entry for the television network: ORTM Télévision nationale, retrieved 2008-02-26.
 Xavier Crespin. KNOWLEDGE, PRACTICE, COVERAGE Baseline Survey Report February 2006 CHILD SURVIVAL PROJECT 21 in Koulikoro (Mali): HELEN KELLER INTERNATIONAL/MALI.  Discussed ORTM's work providing health information.
 Peter Coles, Turn your radio on. New Scientist, 7 October 1995.
 Mali (2007): Freedom House report.
 Six radio station staff freed on completing sentences: Mali.  Reporters Without Borders, 26 September 2006.
 Silicon Mali. Silvia Sansoni, Forbes 02.04.02.
 VOA Training African Affiliates: Broadcasters’ Fiscal Health Key ‘To Guarantee Pluralism’.  Voice of America, 13 September 2005
 Mali Market Information Study FOOD SECURITY II COOPERATIVE AGREEMENT between U.S. AGENCY FOR INTERNATIONAL DEVELOPMENT and MICHIGAN STATE UNIVERSITY: IN-COUNTRY TIME PERIOD: JULY 1987 - DECEMBER 1994.  statistical evidence is consistent with anecdotal reports from both farmers and traders that the SIM radio broadcasts have fundamentally changed bargaining relationships between traders and farmers, forcing traders to offer more competitive prices in isolated rural markets.
 Cécile Leguy.  Revitalizing the Oral Tradition: Stories Broadcast by Radio Parana (San, Mali). Research in African Literatures, Fall 2007, Vol. 38, No. 3, Pages 136–147.
Radio Bamakan - Mali. InteRadio, Vol. 5, No.2, June 1993.

See also
Communications in Mali
Television in Mali

Television stations in Mali
Publicly funded broadcasters
Broadcasting companies of Mali
Malian radio
Communications in Mali
French-language television networks
Multilingual broadcasters
Radio stations established in 1957
Television channels and stations established in 1983
1957 establishments in French Sudan
State media
1983 establishments in Africa